Horipsestis minutus is a moth in the family Drepanidae. It is found in the Chinese provinces of Shaanxi, Hubei, Jiangxi, Guangxi, Sichuan and Yunnan.

References

Moths described in 1936
Thyatirinae